Membribe de la Sierra is a village and municipality in the province of Salamanca,  western Spain, part of the autonomous community of Castile-Leon.

Geography

The municipality has the hamlets Coquilla (5 hab.), Garriel, Navagallega and Segovia del Doctor which only have a family in each.

See also
List of municipalities in Salamanca

References

Municipalities in the Province of Salamanca